Denis Lhuillier (born 9 October 1973) is a French football manager and former player who played as a defender. He was most recently manager of Régional 1 club OL Saint-Liguaire.

References

External links
Denis Lhuillier profile at chamoisfc79.fr

1973 births
Living people
French footballers
Association football defenders
Association football midfielders
FC Rouen players
Chamois Niortais F.C. players
USF Fécamp players
Amical de Lucé players
FC Chartres players
Ligue 2 players
Championnat National players
Championnat National 3 players
Division d'Honneur players
French football managers
Championnat National 3 managers